C. angulatus may refer to:
 Chomatodus angulatus, a prehistoric fish species
 Cladodus angulatus, a prehistoric fish species